Elattostachys microcarpa, commonly named scrub tamarind, is a species of rainforest trees of north-eastern Australia. They grow naturally in the relatively seasonal rainforests, which may have a drought season and often in association with Kauri pine.

The name Elattostachys refers to "little spikes", a flower feature of other plants in this genus. The specific name microcarpa refers to the small woody seeds.

Description 

Leaves pinnate and arranged alternately on the stem. Young shoots and terminal buds covered with short pale hairs.

Cream flowers form on panicle, followed by round pink or red fruit which split to reveal black glossy seeds

References

External links

Sapindaceae
Sapindales of Australia
Trees of Australia
Flora of Queensland